Serkan Yalçın (born 2 November 1982) is a Turkish former professional footballer who played as a defender.

References

1982 births
Footballers from İzmir
Living people
Turkish footballers
Association football defenders
Akhisarspor footballers
Altınordu F.K. players
Boluspor footballers
Sarıyer S.K. footballers
Nazilli Belediyespor footballers
Süper Lig players
TFF First League players
TFF Second League players